Blocker may also refer to:

Computing
 Ad blocker, software for removing or altering online advertising
 Microphone blocker, a connector used to trick feature phones to disconnect the microphone

Medicine
 Antiandrogens, also known as testosterone blockers, a class of drugs that suppress the actions of androgens
 Receptor antagonist, sometimes called a blocker, in medicine a type of receptor ligand or drug that blocks or dampens a biological response

Sports
 Blocker (cricket), slang for a defensive-minded batsman in cricket
 Blocker (ice hockey)
 Blocker, a position in roller derby
 Blocker, a position in volleyball
 Blocker (beach volleyball), a position in beach volleyball
 Steve Roach (rugby league) (born 1962), Australian rugby league footballer nicknamed "Blocker"

Fiction
 Blocker (G.I. Joe), a fictional character in the G.I. Joe universe
 Blockers (film), a 2018 film

Other uses
 Blocker (surname)
 Blocker, Oklahoma, an unincorporated community
 Blocker corporation, a type of C Corporation in the US

See also
 Block (disambiguation)